The 1992–93 season was the 82nd season in Hajduk Split's history and their second in the Prva HNL. Their 1st-place finish in the 1992 season meant it was their 2nd successive season playing in the Prva HNL.

Competitions

Overall record

Prva HNL

Classification

Results summary

Results by round

Results by opponent

Source: 1992–93 Croatian First Football League article

Matches

Croatian Supercup

Source: hajduk.hr

Prva HNL

Source: hajduk.hr

Croatian Cup

Source: hajduk.hr

Player seasonal records

Top scorers

Source: Competitive matches

See also
1992–93 Croatian First Football League
1992–93 Croatian Football Cup

References

External sources
 1992–93 Prva HNL at HRnogomet.com
 1992–93 Croatian Cup at HRnogomet.com

HNK Hajduk Split seasons
Hajduk Split